Steve Swanson may refer to:
 Steven Swanson (born 1960), American astronaut
 Steve Swanson, American former lead guitarist for Six Feet Under